Tall is a tehsil located in Hangu District, Khyber Pakhtunkhwa, Pakistan. The population is 248,503 according to the 2017 census.

See also 
 List of tehsils of Khyber Pakhtunkhwa

References 

Tehsils of Khyber Pakhtunkhwa
Populated places in Hangu District, Pakistan